The 2015 Aksu colliery attack , also known as the Baicheng incident  took place on 18 September 2015, when a group of terrorists, suspected to be Uyghurs, attacked workers and security guards at a coal mine in Baicheng County in Aksu, Xinjiang, leaving at least 16 dead and 18 wounded according to government sources, with other estimates reaching as high as 50 dead and 50 wounded. When local police arrived at the scene, the attackers rammed the police's vehicles before fleeing into the mountains. The majority of the victims of the attack were members of the Han ethnic group.

Background
The attack was reported as China was celebrating the 60th anniversary of the incorporation of Xinjiang into China and the subsequent establishment of the autonomous region. During the celebrations, Yu Zhengsheng, who was then the Chairman of the Chinese People's Political Consultative Conference, made a statement advocating that troops in the region should play a bigger role in fighting separatism, terrorism and extremism. Xinjiang has seen occasional attacks in past years by members of the Uyghur ethnic group in Xinjiang. The Chinese government often blames foreign-backed Islamic terrorism for the violence, while Uyghur groups and human rights activists claim that repressive government policies in Xinjiang push Uyghurs to violence.

Attack
The attack on the coal mine occurred at night. The attackers, wielding knives, first attacked security guards before targeting the miners, many of whom were sleeping in their dormitory beds. They then stole a truck and rammed police vehicles that had arrived at the scene, before fleeing into the mountains, and reportedly stole firearms from police.  Chinese media initially reported 16 dead, but according to local sources, at least 50 people were killed, five of whom were police officers. Authorities kept news of the attack from spreading until mid-November, while local media was slow to report on it. Some local officials even denied that the attack ever took place.

Aftermath
Following the attack, Chinese authorities kept a tight lid on coverage of the coal mine attack, and Baicheng County was locked down. The Chinese government launched a manhunt for the attackers lasting 56 days. The operation involved helicopters, armored vehicles, and 10,000 people including local volunteers. At one point, authorities used flash grenades and tear gas to try to force a number of suspects out of a cliff-side cave and, when this failed, used flamethrowers, forcing them out before gunning them down.

The manhunt concluded with a total of 28 assailants killed; one member of the group surrendered after being urged to do so by his grandfather according to authorities. A senior police official, Memet Tohtinyaz, was reported killed while pursuing the suspects. Dilxat Raxit, spokesman for the main exiled group the World Uyghur Congress, claimed that the dead included women and children, though these claims could not be verified. According to Xinjiang Daily, the assailants were commanded by a foreign extremist group. The captured attacker was later shown on Xinjiang television speaking about jihad in Uyghur with Chinese subtitles.

References

Knife attacks
Massacres in China
2015 murders in China
Deaths by stabbing in China
Terrorism in 2015